Chris Hamon (born 27 April 1970) is a retired footballer from Jersey who played as a  forward for Swindon Town, Cheltenham Town and Dundalk. He also represented the Jersey national team in the 1991 Island Games, scoring four goals (including a hat-trick against Greenland). After retiring from football, Hamon worked as a paramedic.

References

External links
 
 Since 1888... The Searchable Premiership and Football League Player Database (subscription required)
 Chris Hamon: Playing record at Swindon Town

1970 births
Living people
Jersey footballers
Association football forwards
Premier League players
English Football League players
Swindon Town F.C. players
Dundalk F.C. players
Cheltenham Town F.C. players